Sir Michael Andrew Angus Costa (14 February 180829 April 1884) was an Italian-born conductor and composer who achieved success in England.

Biography
He was born in Naples as Michele Andrea Agniello Costa. He studied in Naples with his father, at the Real Collegio di Musica, and later with Niccolò Antonio Zingarelli.

In his youth, as throughout his life, he wrote a great quantity of music, including operas, symphonies and cantatas, all of which has long since passed into oblivion. In 1829 he visited the Birmingham Music Festival to conduct Zingarelli's Cantata Sacra, a setting of some verses from Isaiah ch. xii. This was the occasion of his memorably inauspicious début. The intention was that Costa should rehearse and conduct the work; but J. B Cramer and Thomas Greatorex elbowed him out and was instead engaged as a tenor soloist in another concert. Unfortunately both the work and Costa's singing met with ferocious criticism: "[This cantata] is one of the most tame, insipid things we were ever doomed to hear: a heap of common-place trash from the first to the last note. After twaddling in B flat for half-an-hour, he ventures for a few bars into F, then returns to B, and there is an end." "As a singer [Costa] is far below mediocrity, and he does not compensate for his vocal deficiencies by his personal address, which is abundantly awkward. In the theatre while singing the air "Nel furor delle tempeste," [from Bellini's Il pirata] and accompanying himself, he had a narrow escape. The tempests proved contagious, and were beginning to manifest themselves in the galleries, and had he remained but a few moments longer on the stage, he would have witnessed a storm compared to which the roarings of his own Vesuvius would have seemed but a murmur." Nonetheless he decided to settle in England.

In 1830 he arrived in London, working at His Majesty's Theatre. Costa exerted real influence for change as a conductor at Her Majesty's and, later, at Covent Garden theatre, to which he seceded in 1847 after disagreements with the manager of Her Majesty's, Benjamin Lumley. His concern for discipline, accuracy, and ensemble was a novelty in its time and earned him the admiration both of Meyerbeer and Verdi. Despite this, he could not be claimed as a purist: his re-scoring of Handel's Messiah includes a part for cymbals.

Costa became a naturalized Englishman and received a knighthood in 1869. He was conductor of the Philharmonic Society from 1846 to 1854, of the Sacred Harmonic Society from 1848, and of the Birmingham Triennial Music Festival from 1849-1882. He conducted at the Bradford (1853, 1856, and 1859) and Handel festivals (1857–1880), and the Leeds Festivals from 1874 to 1880.
He also taught several musicians in England, including contralto Emma Albertazzi.

He died in 1884 in Hove and was buried at Kensal Green. His home at 59 Eccleston Square in Pimlico, London, is commemorated with a blue plaque.

Works

Amongst the works of Costa's maturity may be listed his ballets Kenilworth (1831), Une Heure à Naples (1832), Sir Huon (composed for Taglioni) in 1833 and the ballet Alma (1844, later revived as La fille du marbre). His opera Malek Adel was produced in Paris in 1837 and in London in 1844, as was his opera Don Carlos.

In 1855 Costa wrote the oratorio Eli, and in 1864 Naaman, both for Birmingham. Rossini's comment on the former was: "The good Costa has sent me an oratorio score and a Stilton cheese. The cheese was very good." An aria from Eli, "I will extol thee", was recorded in 1910 by the great British dramatic soprano Agnes Nicholls (1876–1959), and the quality of Costa's music can be judged on various CD re-masterings of this particular disc which have been issued in recent years.

Freemasonry
On 3 May 1848 Costa followed in his brother's, Raphael, footsteps by becoming an English Freemason in the Bank of England Lodge, No.263, (London, England). In July 1849 the brothers (in both senses of the word) were Exhalted (Initiated) into the Royal Arch (another branch of Freemasonry) in Fidelity Chapter, No.3. Costa was appointed Grand Organist of the United Grand Lodge of England in 1851 a post he occupied for two years.

The brothers were instrumental in establishing Mark Masonry in England by signing a petition sent to the Bon Accord Royal Arch Chapter (Aberdeen, Scotland) requesting that a Bon Accord Mark Lodge be established in London. The inaugural meeting of this Mark Lodge was held in the Radley Hotel, Bridge Street, Blackfriars, on 19 September 1851. At that meeting both were 'Advanced' (Initiated) to the 'honorable degree of Mark Master.' Mark Masonry in England and Wales later came under the jurisdiction of the Grand Lodge of Mark Master Masons but neither brother appears to have been involved in the creation of that body.

Notes

References

Nigel Burton, Keith Horner: "Costa, Sir Michael", Grove Music Online ed. L. Macy (Accessed 1 March 2005), http://www.grovemusic.com
1906 Profile of Costa

External links
 
 
 Blue Plaque for Costa, from Openplaques.org
 Governing body for Mark Masonry in England.

1808 births
1884 deaths
Musicians from Naples
Italian emigrants to the United Kingdom
English composers
English conductors (music)
British male conductors (music)
Burials at Kensal Green Cemetery
British ballet composers
Knights Bachelor
Composers awarded knighthoods
Conductors (music) awarded knighthoods
Italian British musicians
19th-century British composers
19th-century conductors (music)
19th-century English musicians
Oratorio composers